The Penibaetic System ( or Cordillera Penibética) is the southernmost of the three systems of mountain ranges of the Baetic System in the southern Iberian Peninsula. It includes the highest point in the peninsula, 3,478 m high Mulhacén in the Sierra Nevada.

Geography
The Penibaetic System runs along the south coast of Andalusia, from the province of Cádiz, across the province of Granada, into the Region of Murcia until reaching the Campo de Cartagena. Along its northern side, across the intermontane basins known as the Hoya de Baza and the Hoya de Guadix, runs the Subbaetic System.

The Intrabaetic Basin, a discontinuous series of valleys, separates the Cordillera Penibética from the Cordillera Subbética in the north.

Mountain ranges
The main mountain ranges that make up the Penibaetic complex are, from west to east, the Serranía de Ronda, the Sierra de Grazalema, the Sierra de Tejeda, Sierra de Almijara, the Sierra Nevada, the Sierra de la Contraviesa, the Sierra de Gádor, the Sierra de Baza, and the Sierra de los Filabres.
The following list includes lesser ranges:
Sierra Carbonera
Sierra de Enmedio (Cádiz)
Sierra de Grazalema
Sierra de las Nieves
Sierra Bermeja
Rock of Gibraltar
Sierra de Alcaparaín
Cordillera Antequerana
Sierra de la Pizarra
Sierra del Valle de Abdalajís
Sierra Huma
Sierra Llana
Sierra de Chimeneas
Sierra de las Cabras
Sierra del Co, Peña Negra, 1337 m
Sierra Gorda 
Sierra de San Jorge
Peña de los Enamorados
Sierra de Utrera
Sierra de Cártama
Montes de Málaga
Gibralfaro
Sierra Crestellina
Sierra Blanca
Sierra Alpujata, Cerro Castillejos, 1,074 m
Sierra de Mijas
Sierra de Enmedio (Málaga)
Sierra de Camarolos 
Sierra del Jobo
Sierra de Alhama
Sierra de Tejeda, La Maroma, 2,066 m
Sierra de Almijara
Sierra Nevada, Mulhacén, 3,480 m
Sierra de la Alfaguara
Sierra de Lújar
Sierra de la Contraviesa
Sierra de Gádor, Morrón de la Lagunilla, 2,249 m
Sierra de Baza
Cerro Jabalcón
Sierra de los Filabres, Calar Alto, 2,168 m
Sierra de las Estancias
Sierra de Alhamilla, Pico Colativí, 1,387 m
Sierra Espuña
Sierra de Enmedio (Puerto Lumbreras)

See also
Baetic System
Intrabaetic Basin

References

External links
A map of the range on Encarta.com
Las grandes unidades del relieve - La Depresión del Guadalquivir y sus adyacentes

 
Mountain ranges of Andalusia
Mountain ranges of the Region of Murcia